Sonja Vectomov (born 8 June 1957) is a Czech-Finnish sculptor based in Jyväskylä, Finland, known for her bronze statues of Finnish cultural figures.

In 2010 Vectomov produced a remarkable statue of early 20th century architect and feminist Wivi Lönn, who designed influential buildings in Jyväskylä during the early 1900s. The work was unveiled at the center of a private park facing Lönn's erstwhile mansion, the outline of which appears on the base of its pedestal (a reference to Lönn's use of the same outline on the frontispiece of a doghouse she had designed). Moreover, a number of Vectomov's other sculptures are displayed in the public gardens of the Lönn property under the curation of its present owner, Kauko Sorjonen.

In 2015, in observation of painter Reidar Särestöniemi's 90th birthday and concomitantly in honor of the Reidar Särestöniemi Museum's 30th anniversary, Vectomov produced a statue of the painter for the museum.

Regarding her chosen medium Vectomov has said, "Bronze is the most precious material on Earth. It is uniquely warm, it may be smooth or rough, and it is dynamic—it is capable of expressing many different things." The subject closest to her heart is "the human form and its many positions, which express a universe of emotions." To each of her works, Vectomov devotes more than 500 hours and 400 pounds of melted bronze. She does not eschew marble but rather accessorises it into bronze works.

Vectomov is a pedagogue at Jyväskylä City Art School. She has said that, as a sculptor, nature is her primary source of inspiration. In 2017 she spoke with Finnish newspaper Keskisuomalainen:

In 2020, Vectomov unveiled a bronze wildlife sculpture and exhibited a series of large-scale papier-mâché depictions of the SARS-CoV-2 virus interacting with the classical four elements.

Tätitrio
Along with Teija Häyrynen and Leena Pantsu, Vectomov is a member of Tätitrio (Aunt Trio), an Jyväskylä-based theatrical group that performs dramatic works annually in retirement homes and orphanages. Tätitrio primarily adheres to scripted, memorized texts, with the odd improvisational reverie intended to spur audience participation.

References

Further reading
Divišová, J., ed., Encyklopedie města Hradce Králové (Hradec Králové: Garamon, 2011).

1957 births
Czech sculptors
Czech women sculptors
People from Hradec Králové
Living people
Czech expatriates in Finland
20th-century Finnish sculptors
21st-century Finnish sculptors
20th-century Czech women artists
21st-century Czech women artists